"The Downeaster 'Alexa'" is a song originally written, produced, and performed by Billy Joel for his eleventh studio album Storm Front. The album itself went to number one while the fourth single "The Downeaster 'Alexa'" placed at No. 57 in the Billboard Hot 100. The song was included on Billy Joel's Greatest Hits Vol. 3 album in 1997.

Content
The violin solo is played by virtuoso Itzhak Perlman.

The song is sung in the persona of an impoverished fisherman off Long Island and the surrounding waters who, like many of his fellow fishermen, is finding it increasingly hard to make ends meet and keep ownership of his boat, a type known as a downeaster.

Music video

The music video for the song was directed by Andy Morahan.

Cover versions
 The Brown University a cappella group The Brown Derbies recorded a version on their album Nightcap, with the main vocals performed by Joel Begleiter.
The English roots duo Show of Hands recorded a version on their album Covers.
The American rock band O.A.R. has covered the song since 2007
A parody of the song was featured on The Howard Stern Show, replacing the lyrics with "Baba Booey" and Howard's common variations of it.
This song is also featured in The Hangover Part II during a sequence in which the main characters are on a plane and are driving to a wedding party in Thailand.

Charts

Certifications

References

External links 
 The Downeaster "Alexa" – Lyrics
 The Downeaster "Alexa" – Songfacts

1989 songs
1990 singles
Billy Joel songs
Columbia Records singles
Maritime music
Music videos directed by Andy Morahan
Song recordings produced by Billy Joel
Song recordings produced by Mick Jones (Foreigner)
Songs written by Billy Joel